Karachi language may refer to:
 the language spoken by the Muhajir people
 a language spoken in the city of Karachi: Urdu language